Bobry may refer to the following places:
Bobry, Łódź Voivodeship (central Poland)
Bobry, Masovian Voivodeship (east-central Poland)
Bobry, Gmina Ełk in Warmian-Masurian Voivodeship (north Poland)
Bobry, Gmina Prostki in Warmian-Masurian Voivodeship (north Poland)